Matli railway station is situated at Matli which is a town and capital place of Matli Taluka in Badin District in the Sindh province of Pakistan.

See also
 List of railway stations in Pakistan
 Pakistan Railways

References

External links

Railway stations on Hyderabad–Badin Branch Line
Railway stations in Sindh